Gregg Warburton (born 18 November 1996) is a British wheelchair basketball player. At the age of 19, he won a bronze medal with Great Britain at the 2016 Summer Paralympics.

Early life
Warburton was born in Leigh, Lancashire on 18 November 1996. He had his feet amputated at around six months old and was born with an abnormality to his left arm, resulting in it being shorter and with only two fingers. Despite this, he began playing wheelchair basketball at the age of 10. While attending The Westleigh School, Warburton and his younger brother Lucas played together with the Manchester Mavericks basketball team. Later, he was selected to represent England North at the 2012 Sainsbury School Games, a multi-sport event for school-aged elite athletes. In the same year, he also played with Great Britain's U22 team as they won a bronze medal game at the U22 European Championships.

Career
Following high school, Warburton enrolled at Wigan and Leigh College to study sports while also competing internationally. He competed with Great Britain at the 2014 Under-22 Wheelchair Basketball European Championships, helping them win a gold medal and individually being named the Disabled Sports Achiever of the Year. In the same year, he also played a role in Great Britain's Junior Men's performance at the Kitakyushu Cup, helping them earn a silver medal. Following this, Warburton made his Paralympics debut in 2016 where he helped Great Britain defeat Turkey in the bronze-medal match. He was subsequently shortlisted for SportsAid's One-to-Watch Award.

Four years later, Warburton played a major role in Great Britain's World Championship win in Hamburg, Germany, and was named Most Valuable Player for the men's tournament. He also moved to Badajoz, Spain to play for Mideba Extremadura in the FEDEDDF Division de Honour.

References

External links
 
 

1996 births
Living people
British men's wheelchair basketball players
Paralympic bronze medalists for Great Britain
Paralympic medalists in wheelchair basketball
Wheelchair category Paralympic competitors
Wheelchair basketball players at the 2016 Summer Paralympics
Wheelchair basketball players at the 2020 Summer Paralympics
Medalists at the 2016 Summer Paralympics
Medalists at the 2020 Summer Paralympics
Sportspeople from Greater Manchester